Bromölla Municipality (Bromölla kommun) is a municipality in Skåne County in South Sweden in southern Sweden. Its seat is located in the town Bromölla.

Bromölla was in 1967 reunited with Ivetofta (from which it had been detached as a market town in 1942). In 1974 Näsum was added and the municipality's present territory was defined.

History
The name Bromölla translates to "Bridge Mill", one or more mills used at least from the 17th to the 19th century, adjacent to a small river. The municipal arms depict a bridge over a river, and a water wheel symbolizing the mill.

Urban areas
There are 5 urban areas (also called a Tätort or locality) in Bromölla Municipality.

In the table they are listed according to the size of the population as of 31 December 2005. The municipal seat is in bold characters.

A small part of Valje is situated in Sölvesborg Municipality.

Elections
These are the election results since the 1972 municipal reform. The results of Sweden Democrats were not published by the SCB between 1988 and 1998 due to the party's small size nationally so has been denoted as "0.0". Bromölla has traditionally seen outright majorities for the Social Democrats, although in the 2000s its domination has lessened.

Riksdag

Blocs

This lists the relative strength of the socialist and centre-right blocs since 1973, but parties not elected to the Riksdag are inserted as "other", including the Sweden Democrats results from 1988 to 2006, but also the Christian Democrats pre-1991 and the Greens in 1982, 1985 and 1991. The sources are identical to the table above. The coalition or government mandate marked in bold formed the government after the election. New Democracy got elected in 1991 but are still listed as "other" due to the short lifespan of the party.

Industry
IFÖ Sanitär was founded by William Abelgaard Nielsen in 1887 as a limestone and kaolin mining at the nearby Ivö island. Their main production is, and has been since 1936, to manufacture toilets and sinks. Toilets all around Sweden feature the IFÖ insignia. IFÖ Sanitär is, since 2002, owned by the Swedish venture capital company EQT Partners.

Also important is the Nymölla Stora Enso paper mill, producing fine paper for the world.

Culture
Bromölla boosts remains from the Stone Age, and even some findings of dinosaurs. More recent remains also attract visitors, among them old churches, mills and some other curiosities that have survived the modernisation. In the municipality are several cultural houses, rural museums and mansions that can be visited.

In the town of Bromölla lies a popular cinema visited by people from the whole of southern Sweden. It was elected Best Cinema of Sweden in 2001 by the leading film reviewing program on Swedish television.

Famous people from Bromölla
Johanna Sjöberg (born 8 March 1978), swimmer
Martin Thulin, musician
Inge Danielsson, footballer
Sanna Nielsen, singer

References
Statistics Sweden

External links

Bromölla - Official site

Municipalities of Skåne County